Tina Makereti is a New Zealand novelist, essayist, and short story writer, editor and creative writing teacher. Her work has been widely published and she has been the recipient of writing residencies in New Zealand and overseas. Her book Once Upon a Time in Aotearoa won the inaugural fiction prize at the Ngā Kupu Ora Māori Book Awards in 2011, and Where the Rēkohu Bone Sings won the Ngā Kupu Ora Aotearoa Māori Book Award for Fiction in 2014. She lives on the Kapiti Coast, New Zealand.

Biography
Makereti was born in Kawakawa and grew up in different parts of the North Island, including Auckland. She studied in Palmerston North and graduated with a BA Social Sciences (1994) and PGDip Maori Studies (2007) from Massey University. 

In 2008, she completed an MA in creative writing at Victoria University of Wellington. Her MA work led to the publication of her short story collection, Once Upon a Time in Aotearoa. Her PhD in Creative Writing (2013), also from Victoria University of Wellington, used indigenous literature and perspectives to explore ideas of identity and how this is understood and transmitted following colonisation. 

In 2014 she was convenor of the first Māori and Pasifika Writing Workshop (Te Hiringa a Tuhi) at the International Institute of Modern Letters, Victoria University.  

She has taught creative writing in The School of English and Media Studies at Massey University, and since February 2020, is Senior Lecturer at Victoria University of Wellington's International Institute of Modern Letters and School of English. 

Her writing has appeared in many literary journals, magazines and anthologies including Sport, The NZ Listener, Metro, Huia Short Stories 8, Hue and Cry, JAAM, Turbine, Overland Aotearoa and Landfall. She has presented her work around New Zealand and overseas in Frankfurt, Jamaica, Taipei, Toronto and the United Kingdom. 

Her 2018 novel The Imaginary Lives of James Pōneke is based on the life of Hemi Pomara. 

She is of Ngāti Tūwharetoa, Te Ati Awa, Ngāti Rangatahi, Pākehā and, according to family stories, Moriori descent. She lives on the Kapiti Coast.

Awards and prizes
Makereti's first book, Once Upon a Time in Aotearoa, won the inaugural fiction prize at the Ngā Kupu Ora Māori Book Awards in 2011. Where the Rēkohu Bone Sings was longlisted for the Dublin Literary Award 2016 and won the 2014 Ngā Kupu Ora Aotearoa Māori Book Award for Fiction.

In 2009, Makereti won the non-fiction category of the Royal Society of New Zealand Manhire Prize for Creative Science Writing with her piece Twitch and the Pikihuia Award for Best Short Story Written in English for Skin and Bones. She was Regional Winner, Pacific, of the 2016 Commonwealth Short Story Prize with her story, 'Black Milk'.

In 2012, she was Writer in Residence at the Museum der Weltkulturen in Frankfurt. During her tenure there, she opened the Frankfurt walk which featured New Zealand authors and reproduced part of the Wellington Writers Walk.

In 2013, she was the New Zealand Film Archive Curator-at-Large, using film material such as home movie footage, news and advertisements to create a series of exhibitions exploring the social history of childhood in Aotearoa New Zealand.  She was the 2014 Randell Cottage Writer in Residence and in the same year she took part in Roadwords, a literary tour of southern South Island towns, with three other writers. In 2016, she was awarded the 2016 NZSA Peter & Dianne Beatson Fellowship.

In 2022, Tina Makereti's Lumpectomy won the Landfall Essay Competition.

Bibliography

 Once Upon a Time in Aotearoa (Huia Publishers, 2010) 
 Where the Rēkohu Bone Sings (Random House, 2014) 
 Black Marks on the White Page (RHNZ: Vintage, 2017) (an anthology of Māori and Pasifika fiction, edited with Witi Ihimaera) 
 The Imaginary Lives of James Pōneke (RHNZ: Vintage, 2018) 
 Landfall 244: Spring 2022, edited by Lynley Edmeades (Otago University Press, 2022)

References

External links
Official website
Read NZ Te Pou Muramura profile

Living people
21st-century New Zealand women writers
New Zealand Māori writers
Year of birth missing (living people)
People from the Kapiti Coast District
People from Kawakawa, New Zealand
Massey University alumni
New Zealand Māori women
New Zealand women novelists
Women historical novelists
Ngāti Tūwharetoa people
Te Āti Awa people
Ngāti Rangitihi people
Moriori people
International Institute of Modern Letters alumni
21st-century New Zealand novelists
Historical novelists